Direct Line is an insurance company based in Bromley, England. Founded in 1985, as the country's first direct car insurance company, it has since expanded to offer a range of general insurance products. Its policies are underwritten by the regulated subsidiary UK Insurance Limited, and it is owned by the Direct Line Group.

Company history
Founded in Croydon by Martin Long and Peter Wood with £20 million from the Royal Bank of Scotland, Direct Line sold its first motor insurance policy in 1985. It was the first insurance company in the United Kingdom to underwrite using computers and sell insurance directly by telephone, thus removing the need for a broker and reducing costs.

The company was also the first insurer in the United Kingdom to open its office in the evenings and weekends, and the first to offer a twenty four hour helpline. In 1988, it started to sell home insurance. Direct Line is renowned for having transformed financial services in the United Kingdom.

The company grew by advertising in the national press, television and marketing to RBS customers. It launched a long standing mascot of a red telephone on wheels in 1989, which rapidly established high levels of recall among consumers. 

The mascot had altered slightly over the years; being accompanied by a red mouse on wheels to represent the company's website in 2005, which was dropped in 2020, with another re brand leaving the phone on its own once more. In September 2014, the brand worked with Saatchi and Saatchi to relaunch its advertising, which saw Hollywood actor Harvey Keitel reprise his role as the character Winston Wolfe from the 1994 film Pulp Fiction. The company had one million customers after eight years by June 2003.

The company expanded with a series of new offshoots in the 1990s. In 1995, a Spanish offshoot, Linea Directa, started offering motor insurance in Spain. They expanded into travel insurance in 1996, pet insurance in 1997, and Direct Line Breakdown started offering breakdown insurance in 1998. Other global offshoots included Germany, Italy, and Japan.

Their non general insurance products umbrella Direct Line Financial services launched their first non insurance product, Direct Line Personal Loan, in 1993, the following year, they started to offer mortgages, in 1995, Direct Line Life started offering life insurance, in 1996, they launched savings accounts and a PEP unit trust, and in 1998, the company started to offer pensions. The company's first website, directline.co.uk, was launched in 1997, which was later renamed directline.com in 1999.

The innovations extended into the 2000s with the launch of the first online claims registration and tracking facility in the United Kingdom for its motor insurance customers in 2001, and Home Response 24 Emergency Insurance, launching in 2003. Direct Line was bought by RBS Insurance, a subsidiary of RBS Group, in June 2003. Royal Bank of Scotland was forced to sell Direct Line as a result of European regulations that prevent companies from receiving state aid.

Direct Line floated on the London Stock Market in October 2012. The Direct Line Group owns a number of brands including Churchill Insurance, Privilege and Green Flag. The company made a number of tough financial decisions at the beginning of the 2010s, including abandoning some lines of business, making redundancies, and closing 14 of their 27 offices in the United Kingdom.

Services
Today, Direct Line offers a range of general insurance products including car, van, home, landlord, pet, and travel insurance as well as breakdown cover. They also offer life insurance.

The company started a new subsidiary in September 2007, Direct Line for Business, which provides a range of business insurance products to landlords and the small business sector.

Controversy
In January 2012, Direct Line, along with sister company Churchill Insurance, was fined £2.17m by the FSA, after being found guilty of altering complaints files.

Awards
Direct Line has won a number of awards including:

 Financial Services Forum Awards 2016: Advertising; Customer Experience; Customer Loyalty and Retention, Judges' Special Award for Marketing Excellence.
 YourMoney.com Awards 2016: Direct Winners – Best Direct Car Insurance Provider
 Your Money Awards 2015: Direct Winners – Best Direct Car Insurance Provider

Rebranding
In Italy and Germany, Direct Line was acquired by MAPFRE Group in September 2014, and re branded to Verti in January 2017. Verti is a brand owned by MAPFRE Group, operating in Italy, Germany, Spain and the United States.

References

External links
 Official website

1985 establishments in England
British companies established in 1985
Companies based in the London Borough of Bromley
Direct Line Group
Financial services companies established in 1985
Insurance companies of the United Kingdom
Royal Bank of Scotland
Vehicle insurance